Amenan Koffi (born 1978)  is an Ivorian team handball goalkeeper. She plays on the Ivorian national team, and participated at the 2011 World Women's Handball Championship in Brazil.

References

1978 births
Living people
Ivorian female handball players